The Journal of Building Physics is a peer-reviewed scientific journal that covers the field of building construction. The editor-in-chief is Mark Bomberg (Syracuse University). It was established in 1979 and is published by SAGE Publications in association with International Council for Research and Innovation in Building and Construction.

Abstracting and indexing 
The journal is abstracted and indexed in Scopus and the Science Citation Index Expanded. According to the Journal Citation Reports, its 2013 impact factor is 1.027.

References

External links 
 
 International Council for Research and Innovation in Building and Construction

SAGE Publishing academic journals
Engineering journals
Quarterly journals
English-language journals
Publications established in 1977